The 1988 Sun Belt Conference men's basketball tournament was held March 5–7 at the Richmond Coliseum in Richmond, Virginia.

Top-seeded UNC Charlotte defeated hosts  in the championship game, 81–79, to win their second Sun Belt men's basketball tournament.

The 49ers, in turn, received an automatic bid to the 1988 NCAA tournament. No other Sun Belt members received at-large bids to the tournament.

Format
There were no changes to the existing tournament format. All eight conference members were placed into the initial quarterfinal round and each team was seeded based on its regular season conference record.

Bracket

See also
Sun Belt Conference women's basketball tournament

References

Sun Belt Conference men's basketball tournament
Tournament
Sun Belt Conference men's basketball tournament
Sun Belt Conference men's basketball tournament